Boogaloo refers to the genre of Latin music and dance which was popular in the United States in the 1960s.

Boogaloo may also refer to:

Other dance styles
 Boogaloo (funk dance), a freestyle, improvisational street dance movement
 Electric boogaloo (dance), a related funk dance style

Music
 Boogaloo (Nazareth album), 1998
 Boogaloo (John Patton album), recorded 1968 but released 1995
 "Boogaloo" (song), or "Fyra bugg och en Coca Cola", by Lotta Engberg, 1987

People
 James "Boogaloo" Bolden (born 1950), American musician and band leader
 Boogaloo Joe Jones (born 1940), American jazz guitarist

Other uses 
 Boogaloo movement, a loosely organized far-right anti-government extremist movement in the United States
 2020 boogaloo murders, in California

See also

 Electric Boogaloo (disambiguation)
 The Bugaloos, an American children's TV series
 Boogaloo and Graham, a 2014 British short drama film
 Breakin' 2: Electric Boogaloo, a 1984 American comedy-drama musical film
 Ray Lugo & The Boogaloo Destroyers, an American music group
Boogaloo Joe, a 1969 album by Joe Jones 
The Electric Boogaloo Song, a 1969 album by Cedar Walton
Gon' Boogaloo, a 2014 album by C. W. Stoneking
Jala Jala y Boogaloo, a 1967 album by Richie Ray & Bobby Cruz
Jala Jala Boogaloo Volume II, 1968 
Sugar's Boogaloo, a 1999 album by The Sugarman 3
 "Back Off Boogaloo", a 1972 song by Ringo Starr
 Miles Brown (born 1984), known as Baby Boogaloo, American actor